Wasteland is an open world post-apocalyptic role-playing video game series. The first game, Wasteland, was developed by Interplay in 1988, and was the predecessor to the Fallout games. InXile Entertainment developed the two sequels, Wasteland 2 (2014) and Wasteland 3 (2020), based on crowdfunding.

Wasteland (1988) 
Wasteland was developed by Interplay, which later inspired the Fallout series. The game was published by Electronic Arts. InXile Entertainment later remastered and re-released the game.

Wasteland 2 (2014) 
Wasteland 2 was developed after Brian Fargo obtained the rights from Electronic Arts in 2003. Fargo developed the game with his company inXile through crowdfunding in 2012. The game was released in 2014 for Linux, Mac and Windows, and was later ported to the PlayStation 4 and Xbox One. InXile earned $12 million in revenue from the game. A director's cut of Wasteland 2 was released for the Nintendo Switch in 2018.

Wasteland 3 (2020) 
Wasteland 3 has improved graphics but a shorter playtime of 50 hours compared to the second installment, which had over 100 hours, and is set in Colorado. It includes co-op multiplayer with two players, as well as an updated combat system similar to XCOM: Enemy Unknown. The game was released on Linux, macOS, PlayStation 4, Windows and Xbox One in 2020.

Novellas

inXile had planned to set up two novella series for the franchise after releasing Wasteland 2. These were to be called Rangers & Raiders and Cults & Criminals. However the project was soon abandoned with only three digital novellas released and a fourth one authored by Chris Avellone being shelved.

The three digital novellas for Wasteland 2 were released alongside its "Director's Cut". Two of them, The Earth Transformed – Ghost Book I and Death Machines – Ghost Book II, written by Michael A. Stackpole and Nathan Long, form part of a single narrative and feature Ghost, a clone who joins the Desert Rangers during the events of the first game. All Bad Things was meanwhile written by Stephen Blackmoore and focuses on Luke Samson, the founder of the religious cult called "God's Militia" which appears in Wasteland 2. Those who bought the director's cut received the novellas for free. All Bad Things was also released in paperback format. In 2018, inXile gave away the novellas for free to those who purchased Wasteland – 30th Anniversary Edition.

Upon the release of Wasteland 3, three more digital novellas were released and focus on characters from the game. Legend by Ari Marmell focuses on Saul Buchanan, No Way Home by Carrie Cuinn focuses on Angela Deth, and Ironclad by Matt Wallace focuses on Ironclad Cordite. They were given away for free as part of the game's "Digital Deluxe Edition".

See also 
Fountain of Dreams
Meantime

References

External links 
 

 
Microsoft franchises
Post-apocalyptic video games
Role-playing video games
Video games about nuclear war and weapons
Video game franchises introduced in 1988